Bryconexodon is a genus of characins endemic to Brazil, with two currently described species:
 Bryconexodon juruenae Géry, 1980
 Bryconexodon trombetasi Jégu, dos Santos & E. J. G. Ferreira, 1991

References
 

Characidae
Fish of South America
Fish of Brazil
Taxa named by Jacques Géry
Endemic fauna of Brazil